The following is a list of public and private colleges and universities in Buffalo, New York.

Public colleges and universities

Buffalo is home to three State University of New York (SUNY) institutions. University at Buffalo (SUNY Buffalo) is the largest SUNY institution, and Buffalo State University (formerly Buffalo State College) and Erie Community College also serve the area. The total enrollment of the three institutions combined is approximately 54,000 students.

Facts
 University at Buffalo is a nationally ranked tier 1 research university known as "Buffalo". The University at Buffalo is the flagship and one of the four University Centers in the SUNY system.
 Buffalo State University, a comprehensive 4-year college affiliated with SUNY
 Erie Community College, a 2-year community college affiliated with SUNY

Private colleges

See also
List of colleges and universities in Western New York
List of colleges and universities in New York

References

Education in Buffalo, New York
Buffalo, New York